CAAC Flight 301, a Hawker Siddeley Trident operated by CAAC Guangzhou Regional Administration (now China Southern Airlines) from Guangzhou Baiyun to Hong Kong Kai Tak, ran off the runway in Hong Kong on 31 August 1988 after clipping approach lights. This was the first accident of China Southern Airlines since the split of CAAC Airlines from 1 July 1988. Six crew members and one passenger perished in the accident. The crash shut down Kai Tak Airport for more than six hours after the accident.

Aircraft 
The aircraft involved was a British built Hawker Siddeley Trident 2E, powered by three Rolls-Royce Spey 512-5W, The first flight was in 1973, Total air frame hours were 14,332, C/n /msn 2159. Registration was B-2218.

Accident sequence 
While on final approach to Kai Tak Airport, in rain with  visibility, the right wing of the Hawker Siddeley Trident operating the flight clipped approach lights of Runway 31 and the main landing gear tyres hit the runway promontory, causing the right main landing gear to be ripped from the wing. The aircraft then became airborne and impacted the runway 600 metres further on. The aircraft then veered off the runway to the right and diagonally crossed the grassed runway strip surrounding it. The nose and left main landing gear then collapsed and the aircraft slid over the parallel taxiway and into Kowloon Bay.
The cockpit was cut off and the rest of the aircraft was intact. Attempts were made by divers to get to the cockpit where the flight crew were stationed but were unsuccessful, the cockpit crew were injured by the impact but autopsies showed that the cause of death was from drowning.

Passengers 
Of the 89 occupants of the aircraft, seven died and an additional 15 received injuries. Of the dead, six were crew members and one was a Hong Kong passenger who succumbed to his injuries in a hospital. The dead crew members were in the front of the aircraft. Three crew members, all Chinese, received injuries and survived. Of the 12 American passengers, two received injuries. Seven Hong Kong passengers, two Taiwanese passengers, and one Frenchman received injuries. One injured passenger was a Chinese-American.

Investigation 
The report noted "From the limited evidence available it was not possible to positively determine the cause of the accident. The report concludes that the final approach became unstable, and that windshear may have been a contributory factor. The final deviation below the normal approach path was probably due to a sudden reduction and distortion of the visual reference caused by heavy rain."

See Also 
Delta Air Lines Flight 1141 Another crash that occurred on the same day, also slid off the runway.

References

External links

Final Accident Report (Archive) – Civil Aviation Department - See entry at the HKU Library 

1988 in Hong Kong
CAAC accidents and incidents
Accidents and incidents involving the Hawker Siddeley Trident
Aviation accidents and incidents in 1988
Aviation accidents and incidents in Hong Kong
August 1988 events in Asia